Babu Rao is an Indian name. People with the name include:

 Babu Rao Mediyam (born 1951), member of the 14th Lok Sabha of India
 Baburao Bagul (1930–2008), Marathi writer
 Baburao Painter (Baburao Krishnarao Mestri, 1890–1954), Indian film director
 Baburao Patel (1904–1982), Indian publisher and writer
 Kisan Baburao Hazare (born 1937), better known as Anna Hazare, Indian social activist
 Mohite Subodh Baburao (born 1961), member of the 14th Lok Sabha of India
 Shivram Baburao Bhoje (born 1942), Indian scientist
 Vasant Baburao Ranjane (1937–2011), Indian cricketer
 Ramnath Kenny (1930–1985), Indian cricketer
 Baboo Nimal Baburao Narasappa "Baboo" Nimal (1908–1998), Indian field hockey player

Fictional
 Baburao Ganpatrao Apte, fictional character in Hera Pheri (2000 film)